Rui Adelino Pinto Madeira (born 1 March 1969, in Almada) is a former rally driver from Portugal. He was the first Portuguese rally driver to win an FIA rally title, when he won the Group N class of WRC in 1995.

Career
Madeira started rallying in 1990, taking part in the SEAT Marbella Trophy, held inside the Portuguese Rally Championship for Beginners. Madeira graduated to the main Portuguese Rally Championship in 1992, where he won the Citroën AX Trophy.

In 1993, he purchased the ex-Fernando Peres Group N Ford Sierra RS Cosworth, winning the Group N national title, which he repeated the following year in a Mitsubishi Lancer Evolution.

In 1995, Madeira started an international career, taking part in the seven rounds of the World Rally Championship. Madeira took four class wins on his way to the title in the FIA Cup for Drivers in Production Cars. In the following years, he participated in several WRC events as a privateer, usually in Toyota or Subaru cars, winning the 1996 Rally of Portugal.

Madeira returned to the Portuguese national championship in 2000, as a works driver driving a SEAT Cordoba WRC. In 2001 and 2002, he switched to a works Ford Focus WRC, retiring at the end of the season, making sporadic appearances afterwards.

Madeira currently works as an architect for his family's construction company, Construciv.

References

1969 births
Portuguese rally drivers
World Rally Championship drivers
Living people
Sportspeople from Almada